J. W. Hampton, Jr. & Co. v. United States, 276 U.S. 394 (1928), is a landmark case in the United States in which the Supreme Court of the United States ruled that congressional delegation of legislative authority is an implied power of Congress that is constitutional so long as Congress provides an "intelligible principle" to guide the executive branch.

See also
Separation of powers under the United States Constitution
Fordney–McCumber Tariff
Gundy v. United States

References

External links
 

United States Supreme Court cases
United States Supreme Court cases of the Taft Court
1928 in United States case law
United States nondelegation doctrine case law